The 341st Engineer General Service Regiment was part of the 1102nd Engineer Group of the US Army during World War II and participated in the western Europe theatre specializing in Railroad Construction.  The regiment was involved in the Battle of the Bulge, especially in the Arlon, Belgium region of the front lines.

References

Engineer Regiments of the United States Army
United States Army regiments in World War II
Military units and formations established in 1922
Military units and formations disestablished in 1946